Revi Karunakaran Memorial Museum is a privately owned museum located at Alappuzha, Kerala, India that displays decorative art and artifacts, including a large private collection of Swarovski crystals and ivory.

Revi Karunakaran was the architect of the modernized coir industry of Kerala. After Revi's death in 2003, his wife Betty Karan built this museum in his memory. The objects displayed at this museum were collected by his family over three generations and feature unique artistic pieces from across the world.

The Museum 
In 2003, Betty Karan built Revi Karuna Karan memorial museum at Alappuzha in memory of her husband. This is now a renowned, privately owned museum holding one of the largest private collections of Swarovski crystals in the world along with porcelain, jade, ivory, Keralan artifacts, furniture, and Tanjore paintings.

The family of Karunakarans have been avid collectors of fine art and artefacts since at least three generations. The collection was originally maintained strictly within their private domain. However, after Revi's demise, Betty decided to open the collection to the public, as a befitting tribute  to the memory of their most beloved husband and loving father. Lalichan Zachariah, an architect from Ernakulam, helped Betty design the museum. The museum was inaugurated on 22 November 2006 by the former governor of Meghalaya, Sri. M.M. Jacob.

Built over a period of about three years, the RKK museum is noted for its architectural characteristics such as the frontal Greco-Roman columns and occupies an area of 28,000 sq ft.
A unique feature of the museum is that visitors can see and experience the four major religions of India — Hinduism, Islam, Buddhism and Christianity — that are represented with equal prominence across the murals, ivory collection, Kerala room and other items on display.
The 3rd phase of the museum was inaugurated on 22 November 2015 by Her Excellency Chandrika Bandaranaike Kumaratunga, the fifth President of Sri Lanka.
Most of the pieces displayed  in the museum come with a certificate of authentication, personally certified by Betty.

Many, including former Sri Lankan President Chandrika Kumaratunga, have figuratively compared this museum to the Taj Mahal, as both were built in the same spirit as a symbol and memorial of spousal love.

See also 
 List of museums in India

References

External links
 Official Website
 (YouTube) നാട്ടിലൂടെ (Nattiloode) - Episode 46, a short documentary in Malayalam telecast by Doordarshan, India's national TV
 (YouTube) "Museum of love keeps romance alive beyond the grave", Associated Press Archives

Museums in Kerala
Buildings and structures in Alappuzha
Decorative arts museums in India
Museums established in 2003
2003 establishments in Kerala